Paypayrola is a genus of flowering plants belonging to the family Violaceae.

Its native range is Central and Southern Tropical America.

Species:

Paypayrola arenacea 
Paypayrola blanchetiana 
Paypayrola bordenavei 
Paypayrola confertiflora 
Paypayrola grandiflora 
Paypayrola guianensis 
Paypayrola hulkiana 
Paypayrola longifolia

References

Violaceae
Malpighiales genera